The Sri Lanka national cricket team toured New Zealand in the 2000-01 season to play a five-match LOI series. New Zealand were captained by Stephen Fleming and Sri Lanka were captained by Sanath Jayasuriya.

Sri Lanka won the series convincingly by 4-1, New Zealand saving face by managing to win only the final game.

One Day Internationals (ODIs)

1st ODI

2nd ODI

3rd ODI

4th ODI

5th ODI

External sources
 CricketArchive series itinerary

References
 Playfair Cricket Annual 
 Wisden Cricketers Almanack 

2000–01 New Zealand cricket season
2001 in Sri Lankan cricket
2001 in New Zealand cricket
2000-01
International cricket competitions in 2000–01